Ilija Bozoljac and Goran Tošić was the defending champion, but Tošić did not participate this year. Bozoljac played alongside Flavio Cipolla, but lost the final against Divij Sharan and Ken Skupski, 6–4, 6–7(3–7), [6–10].

Seeds

Draw

External links
 Main Draw

Guzzini Challenger - Doubles
2015 Doubles